First Option is a 1996 Hong Kong action film directed by Gordon Chan, who wrote with Chan Hing-ka. The film stars Michael Wong and Gigi Leung. The film was released theatrically in Hong Kong on 14 September 1996. It was entered into the 20th Moscow International Film Festival.

Cast
 Michael Wong as Officer Don Wong
 Gigi Leung as Inspector Minnie Kwan
 Damian Lau as Inspector Lau (guest star)
 Lee Fung as Madam Katie Ngan
 Kathy Chow as Sue 
 Joseph Cheung as Joe Cheung
 Kim Yip as Forensics tech
 Stephen Chan as Inspector Lau
 Richard Grosse as Rick

Home media
On 30 June 2003, DVD was released by Hong Kong Legends in the United Kingdom in Region 2.

See also
 List of Hong Kong films

References

External links
 

1996 films
1996 action films
1990s police procedural films
1990s war adventure films
1990s Cantonese-language films
Films directed by Gordon Chan
Films shot in Hong Kong
Hong Kong action films
Hong Kong police films
Hong Kong war films
Media Asia films
Police detective films
Remakes of Hong Kong films
1990s Hong Kong films